Dorcaschema wildii, the mulberry borer, is a species of beetle in the family Cerambycidae. It was described by Uhler in 1855. It is known from the United States.

References

Dorcaschematini
Beetles described in 1855